Rose in Bloom is a novel by Louisa May Alcott published in 1876. It depicts the story of a nineteenth-century girl, Rose Campbell, finding her way in society. It is Alcott's sequel to Eight Cousins.

Characters

Rose Campbell: The heroine of the story. She is sweet, kind, pretty, and ambitious. She is an heiress just come of age, and struggles with the many suitors she attracts by learning to judge love versus those who regard her only as "a good match."
Archibald "Archie" Campbell: Eldest son of Jem and Jessie. Eldest of all the cousins, of steady and thoughtful character, he is the Chief, much respected by all the boys and an “older brother” figure to Rose. He works for Uncle Mac and has begun to "settle down", some think too young.
Charles C. Campbell (Charlie): Also known as Prince Charlie, the “flower of the family,” considered the most handsome, talented, and promising of the lot. He is the spoiled only child of Stephen and Clara – spoiled by his too-indulgent mother, with no father present to give him guidance. Charlie is looked up to by all the boys because he is particularly charming and well loved in society, nicknamed "Prince Charming" by the girls. He falls in love with, and tries to woo, Rose.
Alexander Mackenzie Campbell (Mac): The elder son of Mac and Jane. Known as the Bookworm, or simply “the Worm,” Mac always has his nose in a book and is regarded as the wisest and most learned of the cousins, even though he is deficient in basic social skills through his absent-mindedness and lack of interest . In Rose in Bloom, Rose tries to help Mac overcome his awkward social skills by inviting him to accompany her to a dance, and he generally allows her to "polish" him into a well-rounded gentleman. He later falls in love with Rose.
Stephen Campbell (Steve): Younger brother of Mac. A good-natured, though rather conceited dandy, he idolizes Charlie and copies him in everything, not always to his own advantage. However, his intentions are sound, and he proves to have greater self-control and willpower than Charlie ever displays. He gets engaged to Kitty Van Tassel.
William and George Campbell (Will and Geordie): Second and third sons of Jem and Jessie. They are in cadet school now, and very proud of their uniforms, though perhaps a bit awkward by sudden growth spurts. They are just now becoming old enough to travel in society, no longer being children.
James Campbell (Jamie): Youngest son of Jem and Jessie; the much-loved but only slightly spoiled baby of the family. He is known for inappropriately bursting out information he overheard the aunts saying in confidence. He is also a favorite of Rose's, being the only child left of the boys.
Phebe Moore: A sweet maid who Rose befriended in Eight Cousins. Between the events of Eight Cousins and Rose in Bloom, she travels with Rose to Europe and upon arriving in the US at the beginning of the novel, begins a career as a singer. She is accomplished and beautiful, and instantly attracts the attention of several of the boys, but wins Archie's heart without effort or design.
Uncle Alec: Rose's guardian after her father died. He holds a different view to bringing up a girl than the culture at that time, believing that too many balls, attention and admirers ruin a girl, and that wholesome food, regular exercise, a well-rounded education and keeping a pure mind are preferable to the fads of the time. He brings Rose up differently to most girls in her social set, allowing her to study and play and get plenty of exercise. He is naturally the example Rose holds all other young men to. He is Rose's confidant and advisor in almost all things, and proves his worth throughout the book.
Uncle Mac: Younger Mac's father.  A successful importer, and kindred spirit with Rose and Alec. At the beginning of the book, he and Alec begin speculative match-making for Rose's hand with much humor.
Aunt Plenty: The spinster aunt of Uncle Alec with whom Rose and Uncle Alec live.  In this sequel, she is dealing with more physical issues due to old age, and has some issues with pride when Archie wishes to marry someone Aunt Plenty deems of a lower class. She is also dealing with the loss of her sister, Aunt Peace. In the end she comes around to everyone's satisfaction and is a model example of a loving family matriarch.
Aunt Myra: One of the Campbell Aunts who always believes she and everyone else is sick. She drives the family to distraction, and some humor, with imagined diseases. Her only daughter died young, and she is a widow.
Aunt Clara: Charlie's mother.  She loves society, is a great follower of fashion, and is much involved in bringing Rose out. While she loves her son Charlie, she has over-indulged him to the point that he lacks self-will and strength of character, a fact that is noticed and mourned by the rest of the family. She also schemes to have Rose marry Charlie.
Aunt Jessie: The mother of Archie, Will, Geordie and Jamie.  She is the "little mum" whom all the cousins love.  She is like a mother to Rose and would love to have Rose for a daughter-in-law, but despite some disappointment, genuinely tries to welcome Phebe when Archie's love for her first comes to light. Aunt Jessie is the most like Uncle Alec in his modern outlook than any of the other women in the novel.
Aunt Jane: The mother of Mac and Steve; she is very severe and believes in discipline, but has a good heart. Rose comes to have great respect and affection for her despite her somewhat offputting nature.
Kitty Van Tassel: A rich young woman who moves in the same social circles as the Campbells. Steve proposes and they get engaged. She is rather silly, but Steve's and Rose's good influence improve her mind a good deal and she tries to be better.

Plot 
The story begins when Rose returns home from a long trip to Europe.  Everyone has changed.  As a joke, Rose lines up her seven cousins to take a long look at them, just as they did with her when they first met.  The youngest, Jamie, accidentally mentions that the aunts want Rose to marry one of her cousins to keep her fortune in the family.  Rose is very indignant, for she has decided ideas about what her future holds.  From the beginning, she declares that she can manage her property well on her own and that she will focus on philanthropic work.  Charlie has already decided she is marked out for him, with the approval of his mother.
  
Phebe also comes home no longer the servant that Rose "adopted" but as a young lady with a cultured singing ability.  Rose challenges anyone who would look down on "her Phebe", and she is readily accepted as part of the Campbell clan until Archie falls in love with her:  the family feel that Archie would be marrying beneath himself.  Phebe's pride and debt to the family make her wish to prove herself before she will accept Archie; so she leaves the Campbells' home and sets off to make a name for herself as a singer, to try to earn the respect of her adopted family.

After some time at home, Rose has her "coming out" into society, much to her Uncle Alec's chagrin.  She promises to try high society for only three months.  During that time, her cousin Charlie falls in love with her and tries in various ways to woo her. Rose begins to give in to his charm, but he derails the budding romance by coming to her house, late one night, very drunk.  This ruins all her respect for him and she sees how unprincipled he really is.  After the three months are up, Rose begins to focus on her philanthropic projects and convinces Charlie to try to refrain from alcohol and other frivolous things, in order to win her love and respect.

She tries to help Charlie overcome his bad habits with the help of her uncle, but fails.  Charlie does all he can to win her heart, but in the end he succumbs, hindered by his own weak will and his constant need for acceptance by his friends.  Being spoilt by his mother meant he never learned to say "no", even to himself, and his lack of discipline proves fatal:  Charlie's life ends tragically in an alcohol-induced accident on the eve of his voyage to see his father and restore his good character.  Although Rose never was in love with Charlie, she did have hope that he would return a better man and that they might see what relationship could develop.

Several months after Charlie's death, Rose finds out that another cousin, Mac, is now in love with her.  At first, never thought of him as anything but "the worm", she refuses his love; but she does declare the deepest respect for him.  This gives Mac hope, and he goes to medical school, willing to work and wait for her.  She finds his devotion touching, and she begins to see him clearly for the first time, realizing that Mac is the "hero" she has been looking for.  He is exactly suited to her tastes and has become a man in the noblest sense of the word.  He also settles a joke with her by publishing a small book of poetry to wide critical success, earning her respect even more deeply.  It is his absence that shows her how much she cares for him.

While Rose is discovering her heart, Steve and a minor character, Kitty, engage to marry.  This creates a new sensation in the family, and Kitty begins to look to Rose for sisterly guidance.  Rose encourages her to improve her silly mind, and Kitty is a very willing pupil.  Rose continues to wait for Mac's return but reaches a crisis when Uncle Alec becomes very sick while visiting Mac; Phebe nurses him back from the brink of death, at personal peril, and returns him to the anxious Campbells to be greeted as a triumphant member of the family, sealing her own engagement with Archie with everyone's blessing.  This homecoming is completed for Rose when she is reunited with Mac and finally declares her own sentiments.  The book closes with three very happy couples, and much hope for their felicity.

Sources
The Literature Network
Official Website

External links

 Rose in Bloom (c. 1876) at A Celebration of Women Writers

 

1876 American novels
Novels by Louisa May Alcott